The 1983 Central Fidelity Banks International was a women's tennis tournament played on indoor carpet courts at the Robins Center in Richmond, Virginia in the United States that was part of the Category 3 tier of the 1983 Virginia Slims World Championship Series. It was the fifth edition of the tournament and was held from September 19 through September 25, 1983. Fifth-seeded Rosalyn Fairbank won the singles title and earned $30,000 first-prize money.

Finals

Singles
 Rosalyn Fairbank defeated  Kathy Jordan 6–4, 5–7, 6–4
 It was Fairbank's 1st singles title of her career.

Doubles
 Rosalyn Fairbank /  Candy Reynolds defeated  Kathy Jordan /  Barbara Potter 6–7(3–7), 6–2, 6–1
 It was Fairbank's 4th title of the year and the 7th of her career. It was Reynolds' 6th title of the year and the 15th of her career.

Prize money
Total prize money for the tournament was $150,000. The prize money for the doubles event is per team.

References

External links
 ITF tournament edition details

Central Fidelity Banks International
Central Fidelity Banks International
Central Fidelity Banks International
Central Fidelity Banks International
Central Fidelity Banks International